Skägget i brevlådan ("The Beard in the Letterbox", also a Swedish idiom for being in trouble) was the Sveriges Television's Christmas calendar in 2008.

Plot 
The friends Klas, Lage and Renée are searching for Santa Claus, as Lage managed to send away a wrong-written wishlist.

Video 
The series was released to DVD in 2009.

References

External links 
 

2008 Swedish television series debuts
2008 Swedish television series endings
Sveriges Television's Christmas calendar